See also the 125 S, a sports racer sharing the same engine
The 125 F1 was Ferrari's first Formula One car. It shared its engine with the 125 S sports racer which preceded it by a year, but was developed at the same time by Enzo Ferrari, Valerio Colotti and designer, Gioacchino Colombo. Initially the racer was called 125 GPC for Gran Premio Città or Grand Prix Compressore before the Formula One era.

Mechanical details
The 125 F1 used a supercharged 1.5-litre V12 engine and sported a steel tube-frame chassis with longitudinal and cross members. It had a double wishbone suspension with a transverse leaf spring in front and a torsion bar in the rear which was upgraded to a de Dion tube for 1950. Worm and sector steering and four-wheel drum brakes were the norm for the time. The chassis and transmission design was by Valerio Colotti.

The 125 F1 was powered by Colombo's 1.5-litre (1497 cc/91 in³) V12. It had a single overhead camshaft on each bank of cylinders with a 60° angle between the two banks. The engine had two valves per cylinder fed through one Weber 40DOC3 or 50WCF carburettor. With just a 6.5:1 compression ratio, the supercharged engine still produced  at 7000 rpm. However, the Roots-type single-stage supercharger was incapable of producing the high-end power required to compete with the strong eight-cylinder Alfa Romeo 158 and four-cylinder Maserati 4CLT. Strong driving and a nimble chassis, however, allowed the company to place third in its first outing, at the Italian Grand Prix on 5 September 1948 and the company persevered in racing.

For 1949, the engine was further modified with dual overhead camshafts (though still two valves per cylinder) and a two-stage supercharger. This combination gave the car better top-end performance and the resulting  gave it five Grand Prix wins. Development continued the following year, but the problematic superchargers were dropped in favor of larger displacement and Lampredi's 275 engine superseded the original Colombo engine.

The original chassis have been lost (used for Ferrari 275 F1), but an exact replica with the original Colombo engine currently resides in Museo Ferrari in Maranello alongside newer Ferrari F1 machines.

Racing

The 125 F1 debuted at the Italian Grand Prix on 5 September 1948. Three cars were fielded, with drivers Prince Bira of Siam, Nino Farina, and Raymond Sommer who placed third in the race.

Complete Formula One World Championship results
(key) (results in bold indicate pole position, results in italics indicate fastest lap)

Post-WWII Grandes Épreuves results
(key) (Races in bold indicate pole position) (Races in italics indicate fastest lap)

* Indicates shared drive with Dorino Serafini

References

 

125 F1